Mary Ann Hawkins (March 7, 1919 – January 28, 1993), was an American surfing pioneer, diver, swimmer and stunt double.

Biography

Mary Ann Hawkins was born in Pasadena to a bookkeeper and a collector of dolls. She joined the YMCA when she was six but was inspired by Duke Kahanamoku when she was ten. She began training and taking part in swimming competitions. Hawkins won the Pacific Coast Women’s Surfboard Championships in 1938, 1939 and 1940. She also took part in paddle boat racing and surfing competitions and in 1936 she won the Amateur Athletic Union 500-meter freestyle and the 1st ever all-female paddle-board race. She was the National Paddleboard champion and Pacific Coast Women's Surfboard champion from 1938–40 and the 1st female to enter the Catalina-Manhattan Beach aquaplane race in 1939. Hawkins also won the women's half-mile swim in 1939. When not competing Hawkins worked as a Hollywood movie stunt double and put on performances for hotels in Hawai'i. She also spent thirty years teaching very young children how to swim. Hawkins married four times. She had a daughter Kathy with her first husband Bud Morrissey. She had a son, Rusty with her second Don McGuire. Though years and thousands of miles apart both men drowned in boating accidents. Her other husbands were Fred Sears and Jack Midkiff. When she finally retired from the water Hawkins and Midkiff moved to Tucson, Arizona where Hawkins died from cancer in 1993.

Sources

1919 births
1993 deaths
People from Pasadena, California
People from Arizona
American surfers
American female surfers
American stunt performers
Women stunt performers